Scott Joplin is a painting by Ellen Banks. It is in the collection of the Addison Gallery of American Art in Andover, Massachusetts in the United States. 

The painting comprises acrylic paint on canvas. It is part of a series of paintings by Banks that depicts abstract musical scores from notable musicians. Scott Joplin depicts a piano score from Scott Joplin. The painting was completed by Banks in 1982 and purchased by the Addison Gallery in 1983. It has been exhibited twice at the Addison Gallery, in 1983 and 1988.

References

1982 paintings
Paintings in Massachusetts
Paintings by Ellen Banks